Frank Stephens (14 March 1927 – 9 June 1998) was an  Australian rules footballer who played with North Melbourne and South Melbourne in the Victorian Football League (VFL).

Stephens played with the Corowa Football Club in the Ovens and Murray Football League in 1949 and 1950.

Stephens was appointed as captain / coach of the Culcairn Football Club in 1951.

Notes

External links 

1951 - Albury & DFL Runners Up: Culcairn FC team photo

1927 births
1998 deaths
Australian rules footballers from Victoria (Australia)
North Melbourne Football Club players
Sydney Swans players